The Can-Met Mine is an abandoned uranium mine located approximately 12.5 km northeast of Elliot Lake, Ontario, owned by Denison Mines Ltd. The site has been rehabilitated and its tailings facility (shared with the Stanrock Mine) is currently undergoing environmental monitoring by Denison Environmental Services.

The site was in operation from 1957 to 1960, during which time it produced 2.6 million tonnes of ore.

History 
The property was staked by Carl Mattaini and owned by Can-Met Explorations Limited.

In 1957, eleven holes were diamond drilled, each drilling found ore-bearing conglomerate averaging 16 feet thick.

1958 ore reserves were reported to be 6,642,380 tons with a grade of 1.832 pounds of U308 per ton.

The mine had shafts, 500 feet apart, at 2,127 feet and 2,395 feet deep. An ore plant capable of processing 3,000 tons of ore a day was finished in October 1957. Production started December 1957.

In 1960, Can-Met Explorations Limited merged with Consolidated Denison Mines Limited into Denison Mines Limited and the mine stopped operating.

The production value of the mine by year was:

 1957 $240,000
 1958 $12.76m
 1959 $17.85m
 1960 $6.74

Total $37.59

Other mines in the area
 Stanleigh Mine
 Spanish American Mine
 Milliken Mine
 Panel Mine
 Denison Mine
 Stanrock Mine
 Quirke Mine(s)
 Pronto Mine
 Buckles Mine
 Lacnor Mine
 Nordic Mine

See also

Quartz-pebble conglomerate deposits
Uranium mining
List of uranium mines
List of mines in Ontario

References

Uranium mines in Ontario
Underground mines in Canada
Mines in Elliot Lake
Former mines in Ontario
Denison Mines